Namaigawa Dam is a rockfill dam located in Yamagata Prefecture in Japan. The dam is used for irrigation. The catchment area of the dam is 10.8 km2. The dam impounds about 22  ha of land when full and can store 2650 thousand cubic meters of water. The construction of the dam was started on 1979 and completed in 1992.

References

Dams in Yamagata Prefecture
1992 establishments in Japan